Emiddio Lenti (2 December 1628 – 10 January 1691) was a Roman Catholic prelate who served as Bishop of Nocera de' Pagani (1685–1691).

Biography
Emiddio Lenti was born in Ascoli Satriano, Italy on 2 December 1628 and ordained a priest on 23 December 1651. On 9 April 1685, he was appointed during the papacy of Pope Innocent XI as Bishop of Nocera de' Pagani. On 23 April 1685, he was consecrated bishop by Alessandro Crescenzi (cardinal), Cardinal-Priest of Santa Prisca, with Diego Petra, Archbishop of Sorrento, and Pier Antonio Capobianco, Bishop Emeritus of Lacedonia, serving as co-consecrators. He served as Bishop of Nocera de' Pagani until his death on 10 January 1691.

See also
Catholic Church in Italy

References

External links and additional sources
 (for Chronology of Bishops) 
 (for Chronology of Bishops) 

17th-century Italian Roman Catholic bishops
Bishops appointed by Pope Innocent XI
1628 births
1691 deaths